Kirsten Münchow (known as Kirsten Klose from 2002 until 2007; born 21 January 1977) is a German hammer thrower who won the Olympic bronze medal in 2000 with a personal best throw of 69.28 metres.

This result followed the bronze medal she won at the 1998 European Athletics Championships. Her personal best throw of 69.28 metres ranks her fifth among German hammer throwers, behind Betty Heidler, Susanne Keil, Kathrin Klaas and Andrea Bunjes.

Münchow was born in Auetal-Rehren, and first competed for TuS Eintracht Minden, but in 2000 she switched to LG Eintracht Frankfurt, coached by Michael Deyhle. In 2002, she married fellow hammer thrower Holger Klose and the couple had a son. Münchow is a two-time national champion in the women's hammer throw (2000 and 2001).

Münchow divorced in 2007 and is known again by her maiden name.

Achievements

References

External links 
 
 
 

1977 births
Living people
People from Schaumburg
German female hammer throwers
German national athletics champions
Athletes (track and field) at the 2000 Summer Olympics
Olympic athletes of Germany
Olympic bronze medalists for Germany
European Athletics Championships medalists
Medalists at the 2000 Summer Olympics
Olympic bronze medalists in athletics (track and field)
Sportspeople from Lower Saxony